SaksWorks is an American coworking space provider and sister brand to the Saks Fifth Avenue department store chain, both of which are based in New York City and owned by Hudson's Bay Company (HBC). The concept was conceived amid the COVID-19 pandemic to redevelop the former Lord & Taylor brick-and-mortar locations. The first SaksWorks facilities opened within the New York metropolitan area in September 2021.

History 
Hudson's Bay Company acquired the Lord & Taylor department store chain in January 2012, and later sold it to clothing rental company Le Tote in August 2019. HBC retained ownership of the commercial properties, and expressed initial plans to maintain Lord & Taylor operations with the real estate until at least 2021.

HBC announced their coworking space venture as York Factory in October 2020.

References

External links 

Coworking space providers
Hudson's Bay Company
Saks Fifth Avenue
2021 establishments in New York City